Christiania Spigerverk is a steel company which was founded in Oslo in 1853 and developed into one of the largest industrial companies in Norway. In 1972 Christiania Spigerverk combined with Elkem, to become Elkem Spigerverket. It was sold to Norsk Jernverk in 1985, and it again split out as a separate company in 1993.

In 1929 Christiania Spigerverk demerged its nail and screw production into the subsidiary Forenede Nagle- og Skruefabriker, which also incorporated the competing enterprises Den Norske Naglefabrik and Kampens Skrue- og Møtrikfabrik. The production was still located in Nydalen.

References

Manufacturing companies based in Oslo
Companies established in 1853
1853 establishments in Norway